Edmon López Möller, (born July 16, 1996 in Barcelona) is a professional squash player who represents Spain. He played at the 2013 Under 17 Dutch Junior Open Squash, Open International de Squash de Nantes 2015, 2015 Men's European Individual Closed Championships quarterfinals, 2017 Men's World Squash Championship, and 2018–19 PSA Men's World Squash Championship.

He reached a career-high world ranking of World No. 54 in May 2019.

References

External links 

Spanish male squash players
Living people
1996 births